Nicholas Harlan  is an American baseball coach and former first baseman, who is the current head baseball coach of the Central Arkansas Bears. He played college baseball at York College (Nebraska). He has also been the head coach of the York College Panthers (2004–2013).

Playing career
Harlan attended Oroville High School and played college baseball at Feather River College and York College (Nebraska).

Coaching career
Harlan began his coaching career at Feather River College during the 2002 season. He also served as an associate scout for the Philadelphia Phillies during his stint at Feather River.

Harlan was named the head baseball coach of his alma mater, the York Panthers in 2003.

In August, 2013, Harlan decided to leave York to become the pitching coach for Allen Gum at Central Arkansas. After 8 years as the pitching coach and associate head coach to Gum, Harlan was promoted to head coach upon Gum's retirement.

Head coaching record

References

External links
 Central Arkansas Bears bio

Feather River Golden Eagles baseball players
York Panthers baseball players
Feather River Golden Eagles baseball coaches
York Panthers baseball coaches
Baseball players from California
Baseball first basemen
Living people
Year of birth missing (living people)
Sportspeople from Oroville, California
Baseball coaches from California